A Dojang ("Dao center") is a place of worship of the religion of Jeung San Do. Jeungics gather in these temples to meditate, study and worship.

Each dojang has a main room called the sung-jun "sacred shrine", which contains altars for celestial and terrestrial spirits. Typically there are at least four altars: one with Sahng-jeh-nim's portrait, another with Tae-mo-nim's portrait, one representing a local terrestrial spirit, and one enshrining the spirit tablets of the practitioner's ancestors.

Some dojangs have additional altars to honor other regional spirits, tribal spirits, the spirits of those who played a significant role in Jeungic history, or the spirits of those who greatly benefited humanity.

Most of the meditation, study, and instruction at a dojang takes place in the sung-jun, where worshippers believe they are in the presence of the spirits. It is believed to be a place for heaven, earth, and humans to unite as one.

References

Jeung San Do
Religious places